Glossodoris souverbiei is a species of sea slug in the family Chromodorididae.

Distribution
This species was described from Nouméa, New Caledonia.

References

Chromodorididae
Gastropods described in 1875